Javier Martínez may refer to:

José Salinas (footballer) (born 2000), Spanish footballer
José Vicente Salinas (1909–1975), Chilean sprinter